This article provides details of international soccer games played by the Canada men's national soccer team from 2020 to present.

Results

2020

2021

2022

2023

Head to head records
Updated to match played on December 1, 2022.

References

Soccer in Canada
Canada men's national soccer team results
2020s in Canadian sports